Kansas is an American progressive rock band from Topeka, Kansas. Formed in early 1973, the group originally featured lead vocalist and keyboardist Steve Walsh, violinist and co-lead vocalist Robby Steinhardt, lead guitarist and keyboardist Kerry Livgren, rhythm guitarist Rich Williams, bassist Dave Hope and drummer Phil Ehart. The band's current lineup features constant members Williams and Ehart, alongside bassist and vocalist Billy Greer (since 1985, co-lead vocalist since 2006), violinist and guitarist David Ragsdale (from 1991 to 1997, and since 2006), vocalist and keyboardist Ronnie Platt (since 2014), and keyboardist Tom Brislin (since 2018).

History

1973–1984
Kansas was formed in early 1973, with the original lineup comprising Steve Walsh, Robby Steinhardt, Kerry Livgren, Rich Williams, Dave Hope and Phil Ehart. Throughout the 1970s, the band issued a series of critically and commercially successful releases, including US Billboard 200 top ten albums Leftoverture and Point of Know Return. The group's first lineup change came in October 1981, when frontman Walsh left the band during the early stages of writing for their eighth studio album Vinyl Confessions. Speaking in a 2015 interview, Ehart recalled that "Things were hurtling so fast that there was no way to avoid hitting a breaking point," agreeing that Livgren's lyrical content influenced Walsh's departure, but adding that "that was one of many things going on that was making it difficult to be a band."

Before the end of the year, Walsh was replaced by John Elefante, who performed on Vinyl Confessions and wrote several songs for the album. After the subsequent concert tour later in 1982, however, Steinhardt followed Walsh in leaving Kansas. Citing Steinhardt's ongoing problems with substance abuse, Ehart has since recalled that "We'd been trying for ages to persuade Robby to clean up. In the end, we told him that he needed to go away for a while." His role was not replaced – the band was reduced to a five-piece for Drastic Measures. Livgren, the band's main songwriter to that point, contributed only three compositions to the 1983 release.

Six months after the release of Drastic Measures, both Livgren and Hope left Kansas to form AD, a Christian rock outfit. In 1984, the remaining trio of Elefante, Williams and Ehart recorded one song, "Perfect Lover", for the compilation album The Best of Kansas issued that year. During a tour of military bases organized by the United Service Organizations (USO) in March 1984, Elefante decided that he would leave Kansas to focus on his own Christian music. The singer claimed that the band's management threatened to take legal action against him if he left, recalling that "I remember having lunch ... with Kansas' management and attorney. They were working me over, giving me a real brow beating, and threatening to sue if I left the band. I finally said, 'Guys, I'm gone. This isn't the place for me anymore.' And that was it."

1985–1999
After around a year later, it was announced in July 1985 that Kansas had reformed with original vocalist Steve Walsh, who was then touring with Cheap Trick as their live keyboardist. Alongside returning members Rich Williams and Phil Ehart, the group replaced lead guitarist Kerry Livgren with Steve Morse of Dixie Dregs and his own eponymous band, and bassist Dave Hope with Billy Greer, a former bandmate of Walsh's from his post-Kansas group Streets. Morse recorded two albums with the group – Power and In the Spirit of Things – before leaving in 1989 to promote his third solo effort (the first under just his name) High Tension Wires.

Following Morse's departure, Kansas parted ways with MCA Records and went on a temporary hiatus, as the remaining members focused on other projects. The following fall, the group embarked on a European tour which featured the return of Livgren and Hope to the lineup. The tour also featured keyboardist Greg Robert, who had joined three years earlier and performed on In the Spirit of Things. A second leg in North America was scheduled for the following year, with Hope bowing out after the first, before Livgren left again and Morse returned to complete the dates. The 1991 touring cycle also saw the Kansas debut of David Ragsdale, the band's first violinist since Robby Steinhardt left in 1982, who joined in April.

Kansas settled in the early 1990s with the lineup of Walsh, Williams, Greer, Ehart, Robert and Ragsdale, releasing Live at the Whisky in 1992 and Freaks of Nature, their first studio album in seven years, in 1995. In 1997, Steinhardt returned as both Ragsdale and Robert departed. Walsh returned later in the year for an orchestral tour, which led to the recording and release of Always Never the Same with the London Symphony Orchestra.

From 1999

In 1999, Kansas reunited with original lead guitarist Kerry Livgren, who had written and produced demos for several new songs described by drummer Phil Ehart as sounding "like classic Kansas". Recording started in early 2000 for a new album, Somewhere to Elsewhere, at the guitarist's own Grandyzine Studios in Topeka, where the group had originally formed. The album was released in July and also featured original bassist Dave Hope on two tracks, marking the first time the band's original lineup had featured together on a recording since 1980. Livgren remained only for the recording, with the previous lineup of the group returning to tour later in the year.

After several more years touring, Kansas parted ways with violinist and vocalist Robby Steinhardt for a second time in March 2006, which Steve Walsh described as "one of the most difficult things we've ever had to do". He was replaced the following month by his previous replacement David Ragsdale. Speaking about the lineup change, Ehart explained that "Robby just got to the end of the road. He was very honest when he talked to me. He said that he had just lost the desire to do this anymore."

On June 30, 2014 it was announced that Walsh would be leaving Kansas, with his final performance scheduled for August 16. After Walsh initially only stated that "it's time for me to go", it was later revealed that the singer was experiencing vocal problems and had lost interest in the band, with guitarist Rich Williams explaining later that "Steve was really struggling ... [he] had been struggling for years with his voice, but besides that, he just wasn't enjoying it any more." In July, Walsh's impending replacement on lead vocals was announced to be Ronnie Platt, while David Manion – a bandmate of Billy Greer's in Seventh Key – was added as the group's new main keyboardist.

Kansas released The Prelude Implicit, its first studio album in 16 years, in September 2016. The album marked the debut of new guitarist Zak Rizvi, who had originally been brought in as a co-producer but was later made a full member of the group. After another live album recorded on a tour to mark the 40th anniversary of Leftoverture, Manion left Kansas "to pursue other musical endeavors" in December 2018, with Tom Brislin taking his place.

In April 2021, Kansas announced Zak Rizvi has resigned from the band and that he "looks forward to pursuing new projects". As of now, Kansas will continue as a 6 person band.

Members

Current

Former

Touring

Timeline

Lineups

References

External links
Kansas official website

Kansas